Ernst Jünger (29 March 1895 – 17 February 1998) was a German author, highly decorated soldier, philosopher, and entomologist who became publicly known for his World War I memoir Storm of Steel.

The son of a successful businessman and chemist, Jünger rebelled against an affluent upbringing and sought adventure in the Wandervogel German youth movement, before running away to briefly serve in the French Foreign Legion, an illegal act. Because he escaped prosecution in Germany due to his father's efforts, Jünger was able to enlist in the German Army on the outbreak of World War I in 1914. During an ill-fated offensive in 1918 Jünger suffered the last and most serious of his many woundings, and he was awarded the Pour le Mérite, a rare decoration for one of his rank.

He wrote against liberal values, democracy, and the Weimar Republic, but rejected the advances of the Nazis who were rising to power. During World War II Jünger served as an army captain in occupied Paris, but by 1943 he had turned decisively against Nazi totalitarianism and its goal of world conquest, a change manifested in his work "Der Friede" (The Peace). Jünger was dismissed from the army in 1944 after he was indirectly implicated with fellow officers who had plotted to kill Hitler. A few months later, his son died in combat in Italy after having been sentenced to a penal battalion for political reasons. 

After the war, Jünger was treated with some suspicion as a possible fellow traveller of the Nazis. By the later stages of the Cold War, his unorthodox writings about the impact of materialism in modern society were widely seen as conservative rather than radical nationalist, and his philosophical works came to be highly regarded in mainstream German circles. Jünger ended life as an honoured literary figure, although critics continued to charge him with the glorification of war as a transcendental experience in some of his early works. He was an ardent militarist and one of the most complex and contradictory figures in 20th-century German literature.

Biography

Early life
Two of his siblings died as infants. His father acquired some wealth in potash mining. He went to school in Hannover from  1901 to 1905, and during 1905 to 1907 to boarding schools in Hanover and Brunswick. He rejoined his family in 1907, in Rehburg, and went to school in Wunstorf with his siblings from 1907 to 1912. During this time, he developed his passion for adventure novels and for entomology.
He spent some time as an exchange student in Buironfosse, Saint-Quentin, France, in September 1909.
With his younger brother Friedrich Georg Jünger (1898–1977) he joined the Wandervogel movement in 1911. His first poem was published with the Gaublatt für Hannoverland in November 1911. By this time, Jünger had a reputation as a budding bohemian poet.

In 1913, Jünger was a student at the Hamelin gymnasium. In November, he travelled to Verdun and enlisted in the French Foreign Legion for a five-year term, but with the intention of getting to North Africa. Stationed in a training camp at Sidi Bel Abbès, Algeria, he deserted and travelled to Morocco, but was captured and returned to camp. Six weeks later, he was dismissed from the Legion due to the intervention of the German Foreign Office, and escaped prosecution. On the return journey he was told by his father that the cost of representations to the authorities had amounted to a vast sum. Jünger was  sent to a boarding school in Hanover, where fellow pupils included future communist leader Werner Scholem (1895–1940).

World War I

On 1 August 1914, shortly after the start of World War I, Jünger enlisted as an Einjährig-Freiwillige (one year volunteer) Füsilier-Regiment Generalfeldmarschall Prinz Albrecht von Preußens" (Hannoversches) Nr.73 named for the former regent of Hannover, Albrecht von Preussen of the Hannoverian 19th Division and after training was transported to the Champagne front in December. He was wounded for the first time in April 1915. While on convalescent leave he took up a position his father arranged for him to become an officer aspirant (Fahnenjunker).  Jünger was commissioned a Leutnant (2nd Lieutenant) on 27 November 1915. As platoon leader, he gained a reputation for his combat exploits and initiative in offensive patrolling and reconnaissance.
 
During the Battle of the Somme near the obliterated remains of the village of Guillemont his platoon took up a front line position in a defile that had been shelled until it consisted of little more than a dip strewn with the rotting corpses of predecessors. He wrote:

The platoon was relieved but Jünger was wounded by shrapnel in the rest area of Combles and hospitalized; his platoon reoccupied the position on the eve of the Battle of Guillemont and was obliterated in a British offensive. He was wounded for the third time in November 1916, and awarded the Iron Cross First Class in January 1917.

In the spring of 1917, he was promoted to Hauptmann, commanding 7th company and stationed at Cambrai. Transferred to Langemarck in July, Jünger's actions against the advancing British included forcing retreating soldiers to join his resistance line at gunpoint. He arranged the evacuation of his brother Friedrich Georg, who had been wounded. In the Battle of Cambrai (1917) Jünger sustained two wounds, by a bullet passing through his helmet at the back of the head, and another by a shell fragment on the forehead.

He was awarded the House Order of Hohenzollern. While advancing to take up positions just before Ludendorff's Operation Michael on 19 March 1918, Jünger was forced to call a halt after the guides lost their way, and while bunched together half of his company were lost to a direct hit from artillery. Jünger himself survived, and led the survivors as part of a successful advance  but was wounded twice towards the end of the action, being shot in the chest and less seriously across the head. After convalescing, he returned to his regiment in June, sharing a widespread feeling that the tide had now turned against Germany and victory was impossible.

On 25 August, he was wounded for the seventh and final time near Favreuil, being shot through the lung while leading his company in an advance that was quickly overwhelmed by a British counter-attack. Becoming aware the position where he was lying wounded was about to fall to advancing British forces, Jünger rose and as he did his lung drained of fluids through the wound in his chest, allowing him to recover enough to escape. He made his way to a machine-gun post that was holding out, where a doctor told him to lie down immediately. Carried to the rear in a tarpaulin, he and the bearers came under fire and the doctor was killed. A soldier who tried to carry Jünger on his shoulders was killed after only making it a few yards, but another soldier was able to do so.

Jünger received the Wound Badge 1st Class. While he was treated in a Hannover hospital, on 22 September he received notice of being awarded the Pour le Mérite on the recommendation of division commander Johannes von Busse. Pour le Mérite, the highest military decoration of the German Empire, was awarded some 700 times during the war, but almost exclusively to high-ranking officers (and seventy times to combat pilots). Jünger was one of only eleven infantry company leaders who received the order.

Throughout the war, Jünger kept a diary, which became the basis of his 1920 Storm of Steel. He spent his free time reading the works of Nietzsche, Schopenhauer, Ariosto and Kubin, besides entomological journals he was sent from home. During 1917, he was collecting beetles in the trenches and while on patrol, 149 specimens between 2 January and 27 July, which he listed under the title of Fauna coleopterologica douchyensis ("Coleopterological fauna of the Douchy region").

Interwar period

Jünger served as a lieutenant in the army of the Weimar Republic until his demobilisation in 1923.  He studied marine biology, zoology, botany, and philosophy, and became a well-known entomologist. In Germany, an important entomological prize is named after him: the Ernst-Jünger-Preis für Entomologie. His war experiences described in Storm of Steel (German title: In Stahlgewittern), which Jünger self-published in 1920, gradually made him famous. He married Gretha von Jeinsen (1906–60) in 1925. They had two children, Ernst Jr. (1926–44) and Alexander (1934–93).

He criticized the fragile and unstable democracy of the Weimar Republic, stating that he "hated democracy like the plague." More explicitly than in Storm of Steel, he portrayed  war as a mystical experience that revealed the nature of existence.   According to Jünger, the essence of the modern was found in total mobilisation for military effectiveness, which tested the capacity of the human senses. In 1932, he published The Worker (German title: Der Arbeiter), which called for the creation of an activist society run by warrior-worker-scholars. In the essay On Pain, written and published in 1934, Jünger rejects the liberal values of liberty, security, ease, and comfort, and seeks instead the measure of man in the capacity to withstand pain and sacrifice. Around this time his writing included the aphorism "What doesn't kill me makes me stronger; and what kills me makes me incredibly strong."

Third Reich
As a famous war hero and prominent nationalist critic of the Weimar Republic, the ascendant Nazi Party (NSDAP) courted Jünger as a natural ally, but Jünger rejected such advances. When Jünger moved to Berlin in 1927, he rejected an offer of a seat in the Reichstag for the NSDAP. In 1930, he openly denounced Hitler's suppression of the Rural People's Movement. 
In the 22 October 1932 edition of Völkischer Beobachter (the official Nazi newspaper), the article "Das endlose dialektische Gespräch" ("the never-ending dialectical debate") attacked Jünger for his rejection of the "blood and soil" doctrine, accusing him of being an "intellectualist" and a liberal. Jünger again refused a seat offered to him in the Reichstag following the Nazi Party's ascension to power in January 1933, and he refused the invitation to head the German Academy of Literature (Die deutsche Akademie der Dichtung).

On 14 June 1934, Jünger wrote a "letter of rejection" to the Völkischer Beobachter, in which he requested that none of his writings be published in it. Jünger also refused to speak on Joseph Goebbels's radio. He was one of the few "nationalist" authors whose names were never found on the frequent declarations of loyalty to Hitler. He and his brother Friedrich Georg quit the "Traditionsverein der 73er" (veteran's organization of the Hanoverian regiment they had served during World War I) when its Jewish members were expelled.

When Jünger left Berlin in 1933, his house was searched several times by the Gestapo. On the Marble Cliffs (1939, German title: Auf den Marmorklippen), a short novel in the form of a parable, uses metaphor to describe Jünger's negative perceptions of the situation in Hitler's Germany.

He served in World War II as an army captain. On the Western Front in 1939, he rescued a wounded soldier and was again awarded the Iron Cross Second Class. Assigned to an administrative position as intelligence officer and mail censor in Paris, he socialized (often at the Georges V hotel  or at Maxim's) with prominent artists of the day such as Picasso and Jean Cocteau. He also went to the salons of Marie-Louise Bousquet and Florence Gould. There he met Jean Paulhan, Henry de Montherlant, Marcel Jouhandeau and Louis-Ferdinand Céline. He passed on information about upcoming transports "at an acceptable level of risk" which saved Jewish lives. His office was in the Hotel Majestic and he was billeted at the Hotel Raphael.

His early time in France is described in his diary Gärten und Strassen (1942, Gardens and Streets). He was also given the task of executing a German deserter who had beaten the women sheltering him and been turned in. Jünger considered avoiding the assignment but eventually attended to oversee the execution in, as he claimed in his journal, "the spirit of higher curiosity".

Jünger appears on the fringes of the Stauffenberg bomb plot. He was clearly an inspiration to anti-Nazi conservatives in the German Army, and while in Paris he was close to the old, mostly Prussian, officers who carried out the assassination attempt against Hitler. On 6 June 1944 Jünger went to Rommel's headquarters at La Roche-Guyon, arriving late at about 9 PM as the bridge at Mantes was down. Present were Rommel's chief-of-staff Hans Speidel, General Wagener, Colonel List, Consul Pfieffer, reporter Major Wilhelm von Schramm and Speidel's brother-in-law Max Horst (Rommel was in Germany). At 9.30 PM they went to Speidel's quarters to discuss "Der Friede" (The Peace), Jünger's 30-page peace proposal (written in 1943), to be given to the Allies after Hitler's demise or removal from power; also proposed is a united Europe. He returned about midnight. The next day at the Paris HQ Jünger was stunned by the news of the Normandy landings.

Jünger was only peripherally involved in the events, however, and in the aftermath suffered only dismissal from the army in August 1944 rather than execution. He was saved by the chaos of the last months of the war, and by always being "inordinately careful", burning writing on sensitive matters from 1933. One source (Friedrich Hielscher) claimed that Hitler said "Nothing happens to Jünger".

His elder son Ernst Jr., then an eighteen-year-old naval (Kriegsmarine) cadet, was imprisoned that year for engaging in "subversive discussions" in his Wilhelmshaven Naval Academy (a capital offence). Transferred to Penal Unit 999 as Frontbewährung after his parents had spoken to the presiding judge Admiral Scheurlen, he was killed near Carrara in occupied Italy on 29 November 1944 (though Jünger was never sure whether he had been shot by the enemy or by the SS).

Post-war period
After the war, Jünger was initially under some suspicion for his nationalist past, and he was banned from publishing in Germany for four years by the British occupying forces because he refused to submit to the denazification procedures.  His work The Peace (German title: Der Friede), written in 1943 and published abroad in 1948, marked the end of his involvement in politics. When German Communists threatened his safety in 1945, Bertolt Brecht instructed them to "Leave Jünger alone." 
His public image rehabilitated by the 1950s, he went on to be regarded as a towering figure of West German literature.

West German publisher Klett put out a ten-volume collected works (Werke) in 1965, extended to 18 volumes 1978–1983.
This made Jünger one of just four German authors to see two subsequent editions of their collected works published during their lifetime, alongside Goethe, Klopstock and Wieland.

His diaries from 1939 to 1949 were published under the title Strahlungen (1948, Reflections). In the 1950s and 1960s, Jünger travelled extensively. His first wife, Gretha, died in 1960, and in 1962 he married Liselotte Lohrer. He continued writing prodigiously for his entire life, publishing more than 50 books.

Martin Heidegger was heavily influenced by Jünger's The Worker although he did not regard Jünger as a philosopher. Heidegger's interpretation of Jünger's work is compiled in volume 90 of his complete edition, titled "Zu Ernst Jünger".

Jünger was among the forerunners of magical realism. His vision in The Glass Bees (1957, German title: Gläserne Bienen), of a future in which an automated machine-driven world threatens individualism, could be seen as a story within the science fiction genre. A sensitive poet with training in botany and zoology, as well as a soldier, his works in general are infused with tremendous details of the natural world.

Throughout his life he had experimented with drugs such as ether, cocaine, and hashish; and later in life he used mescaline and LSD. These experiments were recorded comprehensively in Annäherungen (1970, Approaches). The novel Besuch auf Godenholm (1952, Visit to Godenholm) is clearly influenced by his early experiments with mescaline and LSD. 
He met with LSD inventor Albert Hofmann and they took LSD together several times. Hofmann's memoir LSD, My Problem Child describes some of these meetings.

Later life

One of the most important contributions of Jünger's later literary production is the metahistoric figure of the Anarch, an ideal figure of a sovereign individual, conceived  in his novel Eumeswil (1977), which evolved from his earlier conception of the Waldgänger, or "Forest Fleer"
by influence of Max Stirner's conception of the Unique (der Einzige).

In 1981, Jünger was awarded the Prix mondial Cino Del Duca.
Jünger was immensely popular in France, where at one time 48 of his translated books were in print.  In 1984, he spoke at the Verdun memorial, alongside his admirers, French president François Mitterrand and the German chancellor, where he called the "ideology of war" in Germany before and after World War I "a calamitous mistake". 

Although he had been cleared of the accusation of Nazi collaboration since the 1950s, Jünger's national conservatism and his ongoing role as conservative philosopher and icon made him a controversial figure, and Huyssen (1993)
argued that nevertheless "his conservative literature made Nazism highly attractive", and that "the ontology of war depicted in Storm of Steel could be interpreted as a model for a new, hierarchically ordered society beyond democracy, beyond the security of bourgeois society and ennui". Walter Benjamin wrote "Theories of German Fascism" (1930) as a review  of War and Warrior, a collection of essays edited by Jünger. 
Despite the ongoing political criticism of his work, Jünger said he never regretted anything he wrote, nor would he ever take it back.

His younger son Alexander, a physician, committed suicide in 1993.
Jünger's 100th birthday on 29 March 1995 was met with praise from many quarters, including the socialist French president François Mitterrand.

Death
Jünger came from an agnostic family and did not hold to any particular belief in God, yet shortly before he died he converted to Roman Catholicism. A year before his death, Jünger was received into the Catholic Church and began to receive the Sacraments. He died on 17 February 1998 in Riedlingen, Upper Swabia, aged 102. He was the last living bearer of the military version of the order of the Pour le Mérite. His body was buried at Wilflingen Cemetery. Jünger's last home in Wilflingen, Jünger-Haus Wilflingen, is now a museum.

Photography
Ernst Jünger's photobooks are visual accompaniments to his writings on technology and modernity. The seven books of photography Jünger published between 1928 and 1934 are representative of the most militaristic and radically right wing period in his writing. Jünger's first photobooks, Die Unvergessenen (The Unforgotten, 1929) and Der Kampf um das Reich (The Battle for the Reich, 1929) are collections of photographs of fallen World War I soldiers and the World War front, many that he took himself. He also contributed six essays on the relationship between war and photography in a photobook of war images called Das Antlitz des Weltkrieges: Fronterlebnisse deutscher Soldaten (The Face of the World War: Front Experiences of German Soldiers, 1930) and edited a volume of photographs dealing with the first world war, Hier spricht der Feind: Kriegserlebnisse unserer Gegner (The Voice of the Enemy: War Experiences of our Adversaries, 1931). Jünger also edited a collection of essays, Krieg und Krieger (War and Warriors, 1930, 1933) and wrote the foreword for a photo anthology of airplanes and flying called Luftfahrt ist Not! (Flying is imperative! [i.e., a necessity], 1928).

Decorations and awards
1916 Iron Cross (1914) II. and I. Class
1917 Prussian House Order of Hohenzollern Knight's Cross with Swords
1918 Wound Badge (1918) in Gold
1918 Pour le Mérite (military class)
1934 The Honour Cross of the World War 1914/1918
1939 Clasp to the Iron Cross Second Class
1956 Bremen Literature Prize (for Am Sarazenentum); Culture Prize of the city of Goslar
1959 Grand Merit Cross 
1960 Honorary Citizen of the Municipality Wilflingen; honorary gift of the Cultural Committee of the Federation of German Industry
1965 Honorary Citizen of Rehburg; Immermann Prize of the city of Düsseldorf
1970 Freiherr- vom-Stein- Gold Medal of the Alfred Toepfer Foundation
1973 Literature Prize of the Academy Amriswil (Organizer: Dino Larese; Laudations: Alfred Andersch, François Bondy, Friedrich Georg Jünger)
1974 Schiller Memorial Prize of Baden-Württemberg
1977 Aigle d'Or the city of Nice, Great Federal Cross of Merit with Star
1979 Médaille de la Paix (Peace Medal) of the city of Verdun
1980 Medal of Merit of the State of Baden-Württemberg
1981 Prix Europa Littérature the Fondation Internationale pour le Rayonnement des Arts et des Lettres; Prix Mondial Cino the Fondation Simone et del Duca (Paris), Gold Medal of the Humboldt Society
1982 Goethe Prize of Frankfurt
1983 Honorary Citizen of the city of Montpellier; Premio Circeo the Associazione Italo – Germanica Amicizia (Association of Italian–German friendship)
1985 Grand Cross of the Order of Merit of the Federal Republic of Germany
1986 Bavarian Maximilian Order for Science and Art
1987 Premio di Tevere (awarded by Francesco Cossiga in Rome)
1989 honorary doctorate from the University of the Basque Country in Bilbao
1990 Oberschwäbischer Art Prize
1993 Grand Prize of the Jury of the Venice Biennale
1993 Robert Schuman Prize, Alfred Toepfer Foundation
1995 honorary doctorate from the Faculty of Arts of the Complutense University of Madrid

In 1985, to mark Jünger's 90th birthday, the German state of Baden-Württemberg established Ernst Jünger Prize in Entomology. It is given every three years for outstanding work in the field of entomology.

Ernst Jünger was the last living recipient of the military class 'Pour le Mérite'.

Bibliography

Collected works
Jünger's works were edited in ten volumes in 1960–1965 by Ernst Klett Verlag, Stuttgart, and again in 18 volumes by Klett-Cotta, Stuttgart in 1978–1983, with four supplement volumes added posthumously, 1999–2003. The Sämtliche Werke edition is now partially out of print (out of print : vols. 6, 7, 10, 15–18), and was re-issued in 2015 in paperback and epub (ISBN epub: 978-3-608-10923-8) formats.
A selection from the full collected works in five volumes was published in 1995 (4th ed. 2012).

The following is a list of Jünger's original publications in book form (not including journal articles or correspondence).

Non-fiction

1920, In Stahlgewittern (In Storms of Steel)
1922, Der Kampf als inneres Erlebnis (War as an Inner Experience)
1924, Das Wäldchen 125 (Copse 125)
1925, Feuer und Blut
1929, Das abenteuerliche Herz. Aufzeichnungen bei Tag und Nacht (The Adventurous Heart: Recordings by Day and Night)
1932, Der Arbeiter. Herrschaft und Gestalt (The Worker: Dominion and Form)
1934, Blätter und Steine (Leaves and Stones)
1938, Das abenteuerliche Herz. Figuren und Capricios (The Adventurous Heart: Figures and Capriccios)
1942, Gärten und Straßen (Gardens and Roads)
1943, Myrdun. Briefe aus Norwegen
1943, Der Friede. Ein Wort an die Jugend Europas und an die Jugend der Welt
1947, Atlantische Fahrt
1947, Sprache und Körperbau
1948, Ein Inselfrühling
1949, Strahlungen
1951, Am Kieselstrand
1951, Über die Linie
1951, Der Waldgang (The Forest Passage)
1953, Der gordische Knoten
1954, Das Sanduhrbuch
1955, Am Sarazenturm
1956, Rivarol
1958, Jahre der Okkupation
1959, An der Zeitmauer
1960, Der Weltstaat
1963, Typus, Name, Gestalt
1966, Grenzgänge. Essays. Reden. Träume
1967, Subtile Jagden
1969, Sgraffiti
1970, Ad hoc
1970, Annäherungen. Drogen und Rausch
1974, Zahlen und Götter. Philemon und Baucis. Zwei Essays
1980, Siebzig verweht I
1981, Siebzig verweht II
1983, Maxima – Minima, Adnoten zum 'Arbeiter'
1984, 
1987, Zwei Mal Halley
1990, Die Schere
1993, Prognosen
1993, Siebzig verweht III
1995, Siebzig verweht IV
1997, Siebzig verweht V

Novels
1939, Auf den Marmorklippen (On the Marble Cliffs)
1949, Heliopolis. Rückblick auf eine Stadt (Heliopolis)
1957, Gläserne Bienen (The Glass Bees)
1973, Die Zwille
1977, Eumeswil
1985, Eine gefährliche Begegnung (A Dangerous Encounter)

Short stories
1923, Sturm
1936, Akfrikanische Spiele (African Diversions)
1952, Die Eberjagd
1952, Besuch auf Godenholm (Visit to Godenholm)
1983, Aladins Problem (Aladdin's Problem)

Correspondence
Klett-Cotta edited Jünger's correspondence with Rudolf Schlichter, Carl Schmitt, Gerhard Nebel, Friedrich Hielscher, Gottfried Benn, Stefan Andres and Martin Heidegger in seven separate volumes during 1997–2008.

 Ernst Jünger, Rudolf Schlichter: Briefe 1935–1955, ed. Dirk Heißerer. Klett-Cotta, Stuttgart 1997, .
 Ernst Jünger, Carl Schmitt: Briefe 1930–1983, ed. Helmuth Kiesel. Klett-Cotta, Stuttgart 1999, .
 Ernst Jünger, Gerhard Nebel: Briefe 1938–1974, eds. Ulrich Fröschle and Michael Neumann. Klett-Cotta, Stuttgart 2003, .
 Ernst Jünger, Friedrich Hielscher: Briefe 1927–1985, eds.  Ina Schmidt and Stefan Breuer. Klett-Cotta, Stuttgart 2005, .
 Gottfried Benn, Ernst Jünger: Briefwechsel 1949–1956, ed. Holger Hof. Klett-Cotta, Stuttgart 2006, .
 Ernst Jünger, Stefan Andres: Briefe 1937–1970, ed. Günther Nicolin. Klett-Cotta, Stuttgart, 2007, .
 Ernst Jünger, Martin Heidegger: Briefwechsel 1949–1975. eds. Simone Maier,   Günter Figal. Klett-Cotta, Stuttgart, 2008, .
 Alfred Baeumler und Ernst Jünger: Mit einem Anhang der überlieferten Korrespondenz und weiterem Material. eds. Ulrich Fröschle und Thomas Kuzias. Thelem Universitätsverlag, Dresden 2008, .
 Ernst Jünger – Albert Renger-Patzsch. Briefwechsel 1943–1966 und weitere Dokumente. eds. Matthias Schöning, Bernd Stiegler, Ann and Jürgen Wilde. Wilhelm Fink, Paderborn/München 2010, .
 Ernst Jünger, Dolf Sternberger: Briefwechsel 1941–1942 und 1973–1980. eds. Detlev Schöttker and Anja S. Hübner. In: Sinn und Form, 4/2011, S. 448–473
  Luise Rinser und Ernst Jünger Briefwechsel 1939 – 1944,  mit einem einleitenden Essay von Benedikt Maria Trappen  Aufgang Verlag, Augsburg 2016,

English translations
Four of his World War II diaries have been translated and published in English as:
A German Officer in Occupied Paris: The War Journals 1941–1945: First Paris Journal, Notes from the Caucasus, Second Paris Journal, Kirchhorst Diaries.

The bulk of Jünger's publications remains untranslated, but some of his major novels have appeared in English translation.
In Stahlgewittern:	Basil Creighton, The Storm of Steel. From the Diary of a German Storm-Troop Officer on the Western Front. London: Chatto & Windus (1929).
Das Wäldchen 125: Basil Creighton, Copse 125: A Chronicle from the Trench Warfare of 1918. London: Chatto & Windus (1930).
Auf den Marmorklippen:	Stuart Hood, On the Marble Cliffs. London: John Lehmann (1947).
Der Friede: Stuart Hood, The Peace. Hinsdale, IL: Henry Regnery Company (1948).
Afrikanische Spiele, Stuart Hood, African Diversions. London: John Lehmann (1954).
Gläserne Bienen: Louise Bogan and Elizabeth Mayer, The Glass Bees. New York: Noonday Press (1960).
Annäherungen. Drogen Und Rausch: 'Drugs and Ecstasy' in: Myths and Symbols. Studies in Honor of Mircea Eliade, eds. Joseph M. Kitagawa and Charles H. Long. Chicago and London: The University of Chicago Press (1969), pp. 327–42.
Aladdins Problem: Joachim Neugroschel, Aladdin's Problem. New York: Marsilio (1992).
Eumeswil: Joachim Neugroschel, Eumeswil. New York: Marsilio (1993).
Eine gefährliche Begegnung: Hilary Barr, A Dangerous Encounter. New York: Marsilio (1993).
Über den Schmerz: David C. Durst, On Pain. New York: Telos Press Publishing (2008).
Das abenteuerliche Herz. Figuren und Capricios: Thomas Friese, The Adventurous Heart: Figures and Capriccios. Candor, NY: Telos Press Publishing (2012).
Der Waldgang: Thomas Friese, The Forest Passage. Candor, NY: Telos Press Publishing (2013).
Besuch auf Godenholm: Annabel Moynihan, Visit to Godenholm. Stockholm: Edda Publishing (2015).
Sturm: Alexis P. Walker, Sturm. Candor, NY: Telos Press Publishing (2015).
Der Arbeiter. Herrschaft und Gestalt; Bogdan Costea and Laurence Paul Hemming, The Worker. Dominion and Form.  Northwestern University Press (2017)
In Stahlgewittern:	K.J. Elliott, In Storms of Steel. (2022).
Der Kampf als inneres Erlebnis: K.J. Elliott, War as an Inner Experience. (2022).
Das Wäldchen 125: K.J. Elliott, Copse 125. (2022).
Feuer und Blut: K.J. Elliott, . (2022).

Filmography
 La Guerre d'un seul homme (One Man's War) (1981). Film directed by Edgardo Cozarinsky juxtaposing excerpts from Jünger's World War II diaries during his years in Paris with French propaganda films of the same period.
 102 Years in the Heart of Europe: A Portrait of Ernst Jünger (102 år i hjärtat av Europa) (1998), Swedish documentary film by Jesper Wachtmeister and Björn Cederberg

References

 .
 .
 .
 .
 .
 .
 .
   in 
 .
 .
 .
 .
 .
 .
 .
 .
 .
 Hervier, Julien, Ernst Jünger: dans les tempêtes du siècle, Fayard, Paris, 2014

External links

  – study of Ernst Jünger's works.
 .
 .
 .
 
 

 
1895 births
1998 deaths
German centenarians
Military personnel from Heidelberg
People from the Grand Duchy of Baden
German Roman Catholics
Converts to Roman Catholicism from atheism or agnosticism
German entomologists
Conservative Revolutionary movement
Psychedelic drug advocates
Grand Crosses with Star and Sash of the Order of Merit of the Federal Republic of Germany
Recipients of the Order of Merit of Baden-Württemberg
Recipients of the Iron Cross (1914), 1st class
Recipients of the clasp to the Iron Cross, 2nd class
Recipients of the Pour le Mérite (military class)
Soldiers of the French Foreign Legion
Magic realism writers
Leipzig University alumni
Schiller Memorial Prize winners
German nationalists
German male poets
20th-century German philosophers
20th-century German poets
20th-century German zoologists
German Army personnel of World War I
German Army officers of World War II
Men centenarians
Writers from Heidelberg